Larissos (also Riolitiko) is a river in the western part of Achaea, southern Greece. Its source is on the western slope of the mountain Movri, near the village Mataragka. It flows through the Prokopos lagoon, and empties into the Ionian Sea in the village Kalogria. Other villages along its course are Kagkadi, Apideonas and Lappas. Its complete course lies within the municipal unit Larissos, which took its name from the river.

History
In antiquity it was the boundary between Achaea and Elis. Near the river the ancient city Dyme was located.

References

External links

Landforms of Achaea
Rivers of Greece
Rivers of Western Greece
Drainage basins of the Ionian Sea